Petru Costin (born 8 July 1997), is a Moldovan football defender who plays for FC Bălți.

References

External links
 

1997 births
Footballers from Chișinău
Moldovan footballers
Living people
Moldova youth international footballers
FC Dacia Chișinău players
FC Academia Chișinău players
FC Dinamo-Auto Tiraspol players
FC Codru Lozova players
CSF Bălți players
Moldovan Super Liga players
Association football defenders